Nicole Gass (born 18 August 1993) is a Swiss ice hockey player who was born in Sherbrooke, Quebec, Canada. She played four seasons for the Colgate Raiders, graduating in 2016 and competed in the 2018 Winter Olympics.

Her uncles John Kordic and Dan Kordic both played ice hockey.

References

External links
 
 
 

1993 births
Living people
Swiss women's ice hockey defencemen
Canadian women's ice hockey defencemen
Colgate Raiders women's ice hockey players
Olympic ice hockey players of Switzerland
Ice hockey players at the 2018 Winter Olympics
Ice hockey people from Quebec
Sportspeople from Sherbrooke